Rudolf Glöckner (20 March 1929, in Markranstädt – 25 January 1999, in Markranstädt) was the first German to referee a football World Cup final when he took charge of the 1970 FIFA World Cup final between Brazil and Italy in Mexico City.

Glöckner, from what was then East Germany, had a long international career, officiating at the 1964 Summer Olympics in Tokyo and also matches in the 1976 European Championship.  He refereed the game between ADO Den Haag and West Ham United in the 1976 European Cup Winners Cup. He had to be escorted from the field of play by 16 police officers when Wales and Yugoslavia met at Ninian Park, Cardiff  in 1976, after the Welsh reacted violently to some of his decisions.

In total he refereed four matches at two Olympic Games and four matches at two World Cups.

References

External links
 Profile at worldfootball.net

 Rudi Glöckner

1929 births
1999 deaths
People from Markranstädt
German football referees
Sportspeople from Saxony
FIFA World Cup referees
FIFA World Cup Final match officials
1974 FIFA World Cup referees
1970 FIFA World Cup referees
Olympic football referees
UEFA Euro 1972 referees
East German people in sports